An oxysterol is a derivative of cholesterol obtained by oxidation involving enzymes and / or pro-oxidants. Such compounds play important roles in various biological processes such as cholesterol homeostasis, lipid metabolism (sphingolipids, fatty acids), apoptosis, autophagy, and prenylation of proteins; the mode of action of oxysterols in these effects is still poorly understood. Several oxysterols are associated with age-related diseases such as cardiovascular disease, eye disease (cataract, age-related macular degeneration), certain neurodegenerative diseases and cancers. The activities of oxysterols in these diseases could be due to their pro-oxidative and pro-inflammatory activities and their ability to act on cellular organelles (mitochondria, peroxisome, lysosome) that can contribute to activate apoptosis and autophagy. There are arguments supporting that oxysterols have important roles in atherosclerosis progression which is involved in several cardiovascular diseases.

Identifying molecules or mixtures of molecules, developing innovative approaches (gene therapy, bioremediation) to modulate the biogenesis of these molecules and their biological activities is therefore of therapeutic interest.

Example 
 Oxycholesterol (5,6-epoxycholesterol)
 27-Hydroxycholesterol

References

Sterols